Mimosa diplotricha is a species of leguminous woody shrub native to the Neotropics. It is an invasive species and now has a pantropical distribution. It is commonly known as the giant sensitive plant, giant false sensitive plant, or nila grass.

Taxonomy
Mimosa diplotricha is classified under the genus Mimosa in the subfamily Mimosoideae of the legume family, Fabaceae. It was first described by the American botanist Charles Wright in 1869. The specific epithet is derived from Ancient Greek διπλόος (diplóos, "double") and θρίξ (thríx, "hair").

Mimosa diplotricha was also described earlier by the German botanist Carl Friedrich Philipp von Martius as Mimosa invisa in 1837. But he had already given the name Mimosa invisa in 1834 to a different species. The name he gave is therefore a heterotypic posterior homonym and thus nomen illegitimum. Wright's name becomes the earliest correct name for the species, while the name Mimosa invisa is now accepted as the correct name for Mimosa rhodostachya. However the name Mimosa invisa is still used incorrectly by some authors for Mimosa diplotricha.

Mimosa diplotricha includes three varieties:
Mimosa diplotricha var. diplotricha C. Wright ex Sauvalle- The nominate variety.
Mimosa diplotricha var. odibilis Barneby - Found only in Mexico, from Sinaloa to Michoacán.
 Mimosa diplotricha var. inermis (Adelbert) Verdcourt - A thornless variety found in tropical Asia. It appears to be a de novo mutation that first arose in Indonesia and Papua New Guinea.

Common names
Mimosa diplotricha is known as the giant sensitive plant, giant false sensitive plant, or nila grass in English.

In the Americas, it is known dormilona de playa, rabo de iguana; and raspancilla in Spanish; and grande sensitive or sensitive géante in French. It is also known as sensitiva trepadora in Cuba; and analeira, dormideira, juquiri-rasteiro, malicia-de-mulher, or sensitiva in Brazil.

In South Asia and Indochina it is known as anthottawadi or padaincha in India; banla saet in Cambodia; cõ trinh nu móc in Vietnam; and maiyaraap thao in Thailand. In Southeast Asia it is known as duri semalu in Malaysia; makahiyang lalaki, bulunsari, or balansuri in the Philippines;  boring, borang, djoekoet borang, or puteri malu in Nusa Tenggara; pis koetjing in Indonesia; and rèmbètè in Java.

Description

Its leaves are bipinnate and bright green with a feathery appearance. They are arranged alternately along the stems. Each leaf contains around twenty pairs of small sessile lanceolate leaflets arranged opposite each other. Like the related Mimosa pudica, the leaves are sensitive to touch, and will curl up if disturbed.

The stems are characteristically very long. They are squarish in cross-section, with four ridges running lengthwise. The flowers are pale pink and looks like a clustered fluffy ball. The corolla is fused (gamopetalous), and there are two stamens for every petal.

The flowers develop into clustered slightly curved seed pods. Each seed pod is more or less flat and covered with small prickles. They are light brown and polished in appearance. They are dispersed through running water or by sticking to fur or clothing. They can remain dormant for up to 50 years.

Distribution
Mimosa diplotricha is native to the tropical and subtropical regions of South America and Central America, including parts of the Caribbean. It is not known, however, if the species is native to North America.

Invasive species
Mimosa diplotricha is fast-growing and can tolerate a wide range of soil and climate conditions. Left alone, they can form impenetrable thickets within a short period that can affect movement of both people and animals, as well as planted crops. All parts of the plant are toxic to grazing animals.

Mimosa diplotricha is extremely invasive and rapidly colonizes areas it is introduced to. The earliest records of Mimosa diplotricha outside of the Americas is in Java, Indonesia in 1900; Queensland, Australia in 1929; and Fiji in 1936. Since then, it has rapidly spread and naturalized throughout Southeast Asia, the Pacific Islands (including Hawaii), northern regions of Australia, and parts of Africa in the latter half of the 20th century.

See also
 Mimosa pudica, the sensitive plant

References

diplotricha
Pantropical flora